The 1923–24 City Cup was the twenty-sixth edition of the City Cup, a cup competition in Northern Irish football.

The tournament was won by Queen's Island for the 2nd time and 2nd consecutive year. They defeated Glentoran 3–2 in a test match at Windsor Park after both teams finished level on points in the group standings.

Group standings

Test match

References

1923–24 in Northern Ireland association football